St Michael's, Torbay may refer to:

 St Michael's Chapel, Torquay, a small medieval chapel
 St Michael's Church, Paignton, a former Church of England church
 An area of Paignton near the former church